The women's 4 × 400 metres relay event at the 1975 Pan American Games was held in Mexico City on 20 October.

Results

References

Athletics at the 1975 Pan American Games
1975